Dilsia was a woman enslaved by future President William Henry Harrison. According to civil rights activist Walter Francis White's family oral history, Harrison had six children with Dilsia.

Descendants 
Walter Francis White's oral history asserts when Harrison decided to run for president, he concluded that it would not be politically advantageous for him to have "bastard slave children" in his home. Accordingly, Harrison gave four of Dilsia's children to his brother; his brother, in turn, sold the children to Joseph Poythress, one of the earliest white settlers of LaGrange, Georgia.

Marie Harrison was a daughter of Dilsia, and was allegedly fathered by William Henry Harrison. Marie Harrison was the grandmother of Walter Francis White.

References

Presidents of the United States and slavery
Slave concubines
William Henry Harrison
Year of birth unknown
Year of death unknown
19th-century African-American women
19th-century American slaves